Jag Janani Maa Vaishno Devi - Kahani Mata Rani Ki, is an Indian television mythological series, which premiered on 30 September 2019 on Star Bharat It is based on the life of Goddess Vaishno Devi. The series is produced by Rashmi Sharma and Pawan Kumar Marut under Rashmi Sharma Telefilms. The show aired its last episode on 2 October 2020.

The series was relaunched from 17 October 2020 on the occasion of Navaratri  with a new name as Jag Janani Maa Vaishno Devi - Mahima Mata Rani Ki.

Plot
The story of Goddess Vaishno Devi begins with the battle between the Gods and Demons reaching dangerous feats, and in order to end all the evil on Earth, the trinity of Goddesses, Lakshmi, Saraswati, and Parvati/Kali, combine together to create a divine force. The divine force is born in the Kingdom of Sripuram, and is given the name, Vaishnavi. On the birth of Vaishnavi, her father is called by the Tridevis in the heavens. The Tridevis tell Vaishnavi's father that Vaishnavi is not an ordinary human and her life has a goal which she has to complete. They tell him that when Vaishnavi is aware of her powers you have to let her take her own decisions and you won't interfere in any way. Vaishnavi's father agrees but when her mother Queen Samriddhi finds about the promise her husband made to the Tridevis, afraid of losing her only daughter she decides to keep her away from the Lord Vishnu temple in their palace. But eventually Vaishnavi sees the Vishnu temple and she realizes her powers. The shows follow a series of incidents where Vaishnavi helps the people in her kingdom. It includes, Vaishnavi offering food to the people of the village. Pleased by this, a girl named Bharti befriends Vaishnavi and gives her a shawl, which helps Vaishnavi assume her real form as Vaishno Devi. When the festival of Navaratri began, Vaishnavi narrates the story of the Navadurgas. This is locally known as a Jagrata. During the puja, Bharti sees a vision in which Vaishnavi is seen taking the form of the Navadurgas. She goes on defeating many demons but with no violence because this is her goal that she has to finish the evil in humans not the humans. Later, the Tridevis give different type of knowledge to Vaishnavi and revokes her inner powers. Later she goes on a meditation for several years in order to fully transform into Goddess Vaishno Devi. Years later, Vaishnavi has grown up and she sets out to help her devotees. Bhairon Nath, a tantrik, is asked by his guru (his guru is a nice man) to find a divine energy he saw through his powers. Bhairon Nath sets out to find the energy but since he is very evil and looking for the energy who is none other than Vaishno Devi. He is unable to find her. When he finally does, he develops some feelings for her which are wrong and Vaishnavi assumes her real form as Vaishno Devi and warns him about the same but he does not listen at last Vaisno Devi beheads him. Lord Shiva sets out to end the world as Vaishno Devi killed Bhairon Nath and as the Trimurtis and the Tridevis had a deal that if Vaishno Devi kills anyone, Lord Shiva will end the world. But Vaishno Devi explains to Lord Shiva that she didn't kill Bhairon Nath but gave him salvation (Mukti) and the reason behind beheading him was his head's arrogance and anger. Lord Shiva calms down and returns to his abode. After this starts the journey of Vaishno Devi and her devotees and how she helps her devotees. The show revolves around her evolving journey from being Vaishnavi, The Princess Of Sripuram, to Goddess Vaishno Devi, the Mother Of the Universe.

In a promo released by Star Bharat on YouTube, Saraswati, Lakshmi and Kali appear at Vaishno Devi's cave and transform into three rocks, which later absorb Vaishno Devi and land on a bigger rock. These three rocks are devotedly worshipped in the Vaishno Devi Temple, in India.

On 2 December 2019, Star Bharat will feature a war in the two serials, RadhaKrishn and Jag Janani Maa Vaishno Devi. In Vaishno Devi, it will feature on how Vaishno Devi turned into Goddess Durga, how she killed Mahishasura and attains the name of Mahishasura Mardini.

Cast

Main
 Puja Banerjee / Paridhi Sharma as Goddess Vaishno Devi. Her other names are Vaishnavi, Trikuta, Sherawali, Jyotawali, Pahadawali, etc. She is the combined incarnation of Saraswati, Lakshmi and Kali. She is the future wife of Lord Vishnu's Kalki incarnation.

 Maisha Dixit as Child Goddess Vaishno Devi. (2019-2020)

Recurring
 Toral Rasputra as Queen Samriddhi, Vaishnavi's mother
 Hrishikesh Pandey as King Ratnakar Sagar, Vaishnavi's father

The Three Goddesses (Tridevi)
 Madirakshi Mundle as Goddess Lakshmi, Goddess of Wealth and Prosperity, Lord Vishnu's wife
 Manisha Rawat as Goddess Saraswati, Goddess of The Arts, Wisdom, Music and Literature, Lord Brahma's wife
 Ishita Ganguly as Goddess Parvati / Kali, The Goddess of Power, Strength, Lord Shiva's wife and as Kali, the Goddess of Death and the Destruction of the Demons
 Aishwarya Raj Bhakuni as Shubhangi
 Preetika Chauhan as Bhudevi, Goddess of the Earth

The Three Gods (Trimurti)
 Vikas Salgotra as Lord Vishnu, the Protector God,  Lakshmi's husband, resides in Vaikuntha
 Kapil Arya as Lord Shiva, the Destroyer God, Parvati's husband, resides in Kailash
 Amardeep Garg as Lord Brahma, the Creator God, Saraswati's husband, resides in Brahmaloka
 Ram Yashvardhan / Ankit Mohan as Bhairon Nath, a Tantrik who sets out for finding Vaishnavi but is ultimately killed by Vaishno Devi.
 Himanshu Soni as Lord Rama, Seetha’s consort, father of Lava and Kusha, King of Ayodhya, elder brother of Lakshmana
 Sailesh Gulabani as Lord Indra, King of the Gods
 Shaily Priya Pandey as Bharti, Vaishnavi's best friend, after 12 years, Bharti is still helped by Vaishnavi in times of distress.
 Athar Siddiqui as Mahabali
 Preet Kaur Madhan as Kadika, wife of Svarna Sagar
 Vijay Badlani as Swarna Sagar, brother of Ratnakar Sagar
 Aarav Chowdhary as Senapati Mahipal, Senapati of Shripuram
 Kunal Bakshi as Maharaj Vimargsen
 Vikas Verma as Moor, the former ruler of the Netherworld
 Aryavart Mishra as Child Chandra Sagar / Child Prasad
 Kuldeep Dubey as Shridhar
 Rohit Kumar as Kumbhak
 Saurabh Sewal Asr as Vibhutinath
 Saurabh Deshpande / Gaurav Kothari as Rechak
 Aakriti Sharma as Rajjo
 Sikandar Kharbanda as Pisachraj
 Sumedh Mudgalkar as Narrator (voiceover)
 Danish Akhtar Saifi as Hanuman, the monkey-God of strength, he is depicted as a human with a monkey head and a tail, he is an ally of Lord Rama
 Khushwant Walia as Bheema
 Adi Irani as Devendra
 Geeta Tyagi as Jyoti
 Naveen Pandita as Narendra
 Neha Bam as Bhakti
 Gaurav Walia as Bhadrak
 Aarushi Sharma as Kishori
 Sandeep Sharma as Pandit jatashankar

References

External links 

 Jag Janani Maa Vaishno Devi - Kahani Mata Rani Ki on Hotstar
 

2019 Indian television series debuts
Hindi-language television shows
Indian television series about Hindu deities
Indian television soap operas
Star Bharat original programming